Memories from a Fading Room is a studio album by English disc jockey and record producer Mark Barrott, under the name of Future Loop Foundation. It was released by Louisiana Recordings on July 16, 2007.

Track listing
Stereo '72
On the Village Radar
Vision On
Garden Communities
Everything As It Should Be
Homegrown Dynamic
In between Somewhere Beautiful
Experimentation Begins at Home
This is Where We Live
Sunshine Philosophy
Eagle Eyed
The Sea and the Sky
(1976)

References

2007 albums